D77 may refer to:

 Neo-Grünfeld Defence, Encyclopaedia of Chess Openings code
 D77 (airport), an American public airport
 HMS Nabob (D77), a Bogue-class escort aircraft carrier
 HMS Trafalgar (D77), a Battle-class destroyer
 HMS Whitshed (D77), a V and W class escort destroyer